Rare Cuts is a Danger Danger compilation album, released in 2003.

Track listing
 "Lovin' a Girl Like You (Could Be Bad for My Health)"
 "Bang Bang"
 "Feels Like Love"
 "Little Girl's Hot Tonite"
 "Don't Walk Away"
 "One Step from Paradise"
 "Hold On Maria"
 "Rock America"
 "Don't Blame It on Love"
 "Live It Up"
 "Temptation"

Personnel
 Ted Poley: lead vocals on all songs
 Al Pitrelli: lead guitar on 2–4, 6–9, and 11, rhythm guitar on 3–4, 6–9, and 11, keyboards on 11, backing vocals on 7-9 and 11
 Andy Timmons: lead guitar on 1, rhythm guitar on 1, backing vocals on 1
 Kasey Smith: keyboards on 7-9
 Bruno Ravel: bass guitar on all songs, lead guitar on 5, rhythm guitar on 2 and 5, keyboards on 11, backing vocals on all songs
 Steve West: drums on 1–10, backing vocals on 1
 Joe Franco: drums on 11
 George Cintron: backing vocals on 7-9

References

Danger Danger albums
2003 compilation albums